Alex Høgh Andersen (born May 20, 1994) is a Danish actor, model and photographer. He is mostly known for the role of Ivar the Boneless in the historical drama television series Vikings (2016–2020).

Personal life
Andersen was born on 20 May 1994 in Denmark to parents Thomas Andersen (father), and Charlotte Høgh (mother).

Alex was born and raised in the small town of Skælskør in the western part of Sjælland in Denmark, Andersen discovered his love of acting while studying drama at school. He participated in many musical oriented plays and was fortunate to gain a lot of experience with many big roles. Like his peers, he began auditioning for film roles.

At age 17, Andersen realised the difference between live performances and acting in front of a camera. This encouraged him to pursue Film and Media Studies at the University of Copenhagen. He started university in 2014, but dropped out in 2015 for the filming of Vikings on location in Ireland.

Interest and hobbies 
When he is not acting, Andersen enjoys spending much of his time focusing on photography. Considering himself a visually-minded person, he continues to learn more and more about cameras due to his experience shooting and directing short films. In addition, he learned dancing, singing, sports, fencing and stunts.

Filmography

Film

Television

Theater

References

External links

1994 births
Living people
People from Slagelse
Danish male television actors
Danish male film actors
21st-century Danish male actors